Mohamed Mahmoud or Mohammed Mahmoud (in Arabic محمد محمود) may refer to:

People
Mohamed Mahmoud Pasha (1877–1941), Egyptian politician, twice Prime Minister of Egypt
Mohamed Mahmoud (boxer) (born 1971), Egyptian boxer
Nano (Egyptian footballer) (Mohamed Mahmoud, born 1985), Egyptian footballer
Mohamed Mahmoud (footballer, born 1998), Egyptian footballer
Mohamed Mahmoud (Islamic militant), Muslim Austrian militant who joined ISIS
Mohamed Ali Mahmoud, Egyptian cyclist
Mohammed Haji Mahmoud, Iraqi Kurdish politician and a leader of the Kurdistan Socialist Democratic Party
Mohamed Sedky Mahmoud (1914-1984), Egyptian military leader
Mohammed Moustafa Mahmoud (born 1956), an Iraqi Olympic wrestler

as part of the name
Ahmed Mohamed Mahmoud (1974–2011), Egyptian journalist, reporter
Ammar Mohammed Mahmoud, Sudanese diplomat
Mohamed Mahmoud Abdel Aziz, Egyptian producer and actor
Hassan Mohamed Mahmoud (born 1984), Egyptian hammer thrower
Mohamed Mahmoud Ould Louly (born 1943), President of Mauritania
Mohamed Mahmoud Ould Mohamed Lemine (born 1952), Mauritanian politician
Mohamed Mahmoud Ould Mohamedou (born 1968), Mauritanian scholar and politician

Places
Mohamed Mahmoud Khalil Museum, a museum in Greater Cairo, in the Giza area, Egypt

Others
Mohamed Mahmoud graffiti, a collection of graffiti that was painted on several walls in the area surrounding Mohamed Mahmoud street near Tahrir Square in Cairo, Egypt during the 2011 Egyptian revolution

See also
Mahmoud Mohamed (disambiguation)

Mahmoud, Mohamed